Gucha River, referred to as the River Kuja by Luo community originates in the highlands of Kiabonyoru in Nyamira County passing through the heart of Gucha District running west through Migori country where it is joins the Migori River and flows as the Kuja-Migori River into Lake Victoria.

As it runs across the Gusii Land part of it becomes the Mogonga River, known for its deadly effects when it floods. Mogonga and Gucha are almost equal in size and they meet just 1 mile before flowing through the Ogembo Town center.

The Gucha-Migori river changed its course near its mouth in 2001-2002, moving north to its present location.

About 45 km from Migori, the Gogo Falls dam was completed in 1956 with a hydropower capacity of 2MW, connected to the Kenyan national grid. 
The dam is operated by Kenya Electricity Generating Company (Kengen). 
In 2014, Kenyan government announced an upgrade to the dam, to increase capacity to 12MW, regulate flow to prevent flooding, and allow irrigation of approximately 25,000ha.
As of February 2016, the Orango irrigation intake and canals have been built downstream of the dam for the use of Okenge and Owiro farmers in Migori County, but construction of distributary channels have been delayed.

The Gogo Falls archaeological site is located near the dam.

References 

Rivers of Kenya
Tributaries of Lake Victoria